Maghan II was mansa of the Mali Empire from 1387 to 1389. He was the son of Mansa Mari Diata II and the brother of Mansa Musa II.

Tunisian historian Ibn Khaldun records that Maghan II succeeded his brother to the throne in 1387, but reigned for only two years before his throne was usurped by Sandaki in 1389.

See also
Mali Empire
Keita Dynasty

1389 deaths
Mansas of Mali
People of the Mali Empire
14th-century monarchs in Africa
Year of birth unknown
Keita family